Porichthys notatus is a species of batrachoid toadfish. It is a member of the midshipman genus, Porichthys, and is known by the common name plainfin midshipman. It is native to the eastern Pacific Ocean, where its distribution extends along the coast from Sitka, Alaska, to Magdalena Bay in southern Baja California.

Description
It is brownish to olive to iridescent purple dorsally, becoming lighter on the sides and yellowish/golden on the belly. Below the eye is a whitish patch and black crescent. A young individual may have a dark saddle-mark. P. notatus has wide pectoral fins and a narrow but rounded tail fin.

Habitat and behavior

Its diet includes crustaceans and fish. It is nocturnal, feeding at night and resting during the day, when it buries itself in the sand.

Breeding
This fish is oviparous, and the male is dimorphic, designated as Type I and Type II. The Type I male claims a nest site, which is generally under a rock in the intertidal zone. Once the female spawns, she leaves the eggs in the care of the male and departs. One female can lay up to 400 eggs, and the number of eggs varies directly with body size. The male may mate with a few females and end up with over 1000 eggs in his nest. The eggs and larvae adhere to the wall of the nest. The male tends them by fanning them, keeping the nest clean, and hydrating them if they begin to desiccate at low tide. He protects the larvae post-hatching until they reach their juvenile stage and leave the nest, about 45 days after fertilization. Very occasionally, an egg will yield twin larvae.

Type II male is much smaller in size than the Type I. There are significantly fewer Type II males than Type I males within reproductively active populations of males, with a Type I to Type II ratio around 9:1. In contrast to Type I males, Type II males do not defend nests or guard eggs, but rather sneak in to the nest sites of Type I males and fertilize the eggs there. Type II males at times display behavior of fanning their own sperm into a nest containing a gravid female. The ratio of gonad weight to body weight of Type II males is on average nine times greater than that of Type I males. Type II males can be mistaken as gravid females as their abdomen distend due to enlarged testes.

The conditions of the intertidal breeding habitat change regularly with the tide. A male that tends to his nest can become stranded as the tide recedes, even becoming beached completely out of the water. The fish tolerates this well. It can breathe air. Physiologically, it is well adapted to hypoxia, as well as hypercapnia. Even its sperm are quite functional in low-oxygen conditions.

Bioluminescence

P. notatus is bioluminescent. It has photophores in the skin of its head and much of its body. One fish has over 700 photophores, each about a millimeter wide. They contain luciferin. Norepinephrine activates them, producing a distinct fluorescent green glow. The fish is only luminescent during courtship. It may however, play a role in predator avoidance, as well. In the juvenile, photophores point ventrally, directing their illumination downwards. This helps to shadow the fish in a silhouette that might make it harder for predators to see.

Not all individuals express this trait. There are two main populations of the species, a southern population found as far north as San Francisco, and a second population extending to the northern reaches of its range. Fish of the southern population are bioluminescent, but most northern fish are not, particularly those from the Puget Sound. The nonluminescent fish lack luciferin in their photophores. In experiments, nonluminescent fish can be made luminescent by dosing them orally or by injection with luciferin obtained from the luminescent ostracod crustacean Vargula hilgendorfii. This crustacean has a similar, but not identical, luciferin compound which can apparently function in the photophores of the fish, as well. It is thought that the fish obtains its luciferin in the wild by eating this type of crustacean, perhaps a relative such as Vargula tsujii, and that the nonluminescent northern population does not have any of these available to them.

Vocalization
Both male and female of the species produce vocalizations. The female may produce a brief grunting sound, usually in agonistic encounters. The Type II male performs similar behaviors. The Type I male is much more vocal, both in conflict situations and in courtship. He utters long strings of shorter grunts and growls while fighting, but his courtship call is more of a prolonged hum. He may produce this sound for over an hour at a time, reaching frequencies near 100 Hz. When a male makes the sound, gravid females respond by moving toward him.

The fish produces the sound using the muscles of its modified swim bladder. It receives the sound in its saccule, a sensory organ in the inner ear. During the breeding season, hormones induce the microscopic anatomy of the female's saccules to change in such a way that she can better sense the harmonics of the male's calls.

People in some areas are very familiar with the sound of this fish. Where there are many breeding males, the sound of many simultaneous long, loud underwater courtship calls can be clearly heard on land. In parts of Washington and in the San Francisco Bay Area there are noisemaking populations. The fish is notorious in Sausalito, California, where a community of people live on houseboats. The resident population of the fish becomes very obvious during the breeding season, when it spends the night vocalizing so loudly it keeps the houseboat residents awake. Its calling is most intense between midnight and 6:00 am. Despite its annoying behavior the fish inspired an affectionate local tribute in Sausalito, the Humming Toadfish Festival.

The sound of the vocalization has been likened to a chorus of kazoos, B-29s flying in formation, an amplifier, a didgeridoo, "a drone of bees or maybe even the chanting of monks," and "an orchestra full of mournful, rasping oboes."

Predators

This fish is an important prey for the bald eagle in some coastal areas, being the most common food provided to eaglets by their parents in one study on Vancouver Island. This is a concern, however, because this fish has been found to contain relatively high levels of contaminants, such as dioxin. It is also prey for the northwestern crow, the glaucous-winged gull, and the great blue heron. It is eaten by seals and sea lions.

P. notatus is host to the parasitic copepods Lepeophtheirus remiopsis and Hamaticolax prolixus.

Conservation
P. notatus is not a threatened species. It is widespread and apparently not in decline.

References

Batrachoididae
Fish described in 1854